Tortyra cuprinella is a moth of the family Choreutidae. It is known from Panama and Costa Rica.

References

Tortyra
Moths described in 1914